The North Coast League (NCL) was a high school athletic conference for Catholic schools in Greater Cleveland, Ohio.  The NCL was founded in 1984 by six parochial high schools: Cleveland Central Catholic, Holy Name, Lake Catholic, Pacua Franciscan, St. Peter Chanel, and Trinity.  The league expanded throughout the 1990s and 2000s, reaching a peak of 13 members in the early-to-mid 2010s, before declining in membership.  The NCL disbanded after the 2019-20 school year.

Members

A Girls' sports only
B Boys' sports only

Membership timeline

State championships
This chart only includes state championships won by the schools while in the North Coast League in sports sanctioned by the NCL.

Scheduling

Football
During the season, every school must play five league games, one against every other school in its own division.  They are generally played the final five weeks of the season.  Schools are also allowed to schedule schools in the other division, however these games are considered independent and do not count in NCL standings.  Prior to 2011, each school played an additional school in the other division in a "crossover" game.  The crossover opponents rotated on two-year stints.

In 2013, 2017, and 2019, the White Division only had five schools, so they played a four-game schedule those seasons.

Other sports
In other sports, such as basketball and volleyball, where more games are played during the season, each school must play 10 games against NCL opponents.  Every school plays every other school in its division twice (once home, once away) Schools are also allowed to schedule schools in the other division, however these games are considered independent and do not count in NCL standings. Prior to the 2011 expansion, schools played 13 games:  a home-and-away series against division opponents and a single game against inter-division foes.

In other sports such as track and swimming where schools have "meets" instead of individual games, there is one NCL meet for all schools in the league. For ice hockey a tournament is played in December to determine the conference champion as teams do not play an NCL schedule during the regular season.

References

Sports organizations established in 1984
Ohio high school sports conferences
Sports in Greater Cleveland